NFL Blitz '99 is an arcade style sports video game.  Released in 1998, it was the second game in the NFL Blitz series. The game was released for arcade play.

Compatibility

The arcade cabinet has a slot on the side for a Nintendo 64 Controller Pak to load created plays from the Nintendo 64 version of NFL Blitz.

Reception
In 1999, Next Generation listed NFL Blitz '99 as number 33 on their "Top 50 Games of All Time", commenting that, "The enhanced graphics, and great voice-overs makes this one of the best arcade games we've played, and the ability to create plays on an N64 and use them in the arcade adds to the playability even more." In 2003, NFL Blitz '99 was inducted into GameSpot's list of the greatest games of all time.

References

1998 video games
Arcade video games
Arcade-only video games
Midway video games
NFL Blitz video games
North America-exclusive video games
Video games developed in the United States
Video games set in 1999